Harrods Buenos Aires is a historic commercial building of a department store in Buenos Aires, Argentina located at the corner of Córdoba Avenue and San Martin. It was a branch of Harrods of London founded in 1913 by the proprietors of the London store following the acquisition of the furniture business Messrs H C Thompson & Co.

History 
Established in 1914 on 877 Florida Street as the only overseas branch of the renowned Harrods of London, the department store was expanded in 1920, and grew to occupy almost an entire Retiro-area city block. Following its expansion, the 47,000 m² (500,000 ft²) landmark was crowned by an eighth-story cupola overlooking Córdoba Avenue, and featured marble steps and cedar flooring throughout, as well as wrought-iron elevators with a riding capacity for twenty, valet service, and a jazz orchestra. The store was purchased by competing local retailer Gath & Chaves in 1922, and the two Florida Street institutions were, in turn, acquired by the Italian-Argentine holding company, Almacenes Argentinos, in 1970.

These latter owners closed Gath y Chaves in 1974, and in 1977, sold their interest in the remaining store (Harrods) to a consortium led by Pérez Companc, a prominent local conglomerate. By 1983, the store was controlled by Atilio Gilbertoni, its former general manager under Pérez Companc, and Swiss venture capital firm CBC Interconfianz.

Store closure
The purchase that year of the flagship Knightsbridge store by Mohammed Al-Fayed led to conflict after Gilbertoni refused an offer from the Egyptian shipping magnate for the local Harrods license. The ongoing legal struggles and faltering local economy led to the closure of the store's top floors after a 1989 currency crisis. Fayed's lawsuit was ultimately dismissed by the British House of Lords in 1998, and though it continued to receive 80,000 customers a day and average a million US dollars in daily sales, lingering debts then resulted in the historic retailer's closure, at the end of that year.  Gilbertoni narrowly avoided its auction, and rejected numerous offers for the ailing store, among them from Chilean retailer Falabella, Madrid's El Corte Inglés, and Paris' Printemps, among others.

Restoration
The interior was partially restored and reopened in 2003 to host periodic art festivals and other cultural events, and among the more notable events hosted at the location were the 10th and 11th Buenos Aires Tango Festival, in 2008 and 2009.

Representatives from CBC Interconfianz announced in March 2009 that permits had been filed with city authorities to fully refurbish Harrods Buenos Aires (which can presently operate under that name only in Argentina), and to reopen the landmark department store.

See also 
 Galerías Pacífico

References

 "Results of Harrods Ltd (London) vs Harrods Buenos Aires"  July 1997
 Independent: "The other Harrods shows Argentina is in recovery"  June 2003

External links
 
 Harrods Buenos Aires

Shopping malls in Buenos Aires
Buildings and structures completed in 1914
Defunct department stores
Department store buildings
Buenos Aires
1914 establishments in Argentina
1998 disestablishments in Argentina